Mom Luang Bua Kitiyakara (25 November 1909 – 19 September 1999), née Mom Luang Bua Snidvongs, stage-named Prathum Chitchuea, was a Thai actress and the wife of Nakkhatra Mangala, Prince of Chanthaburi II and was the mother of Queen Sirikit and the maternal grandmother of King Vajiralongkorn.

Life 
Mom Luang Bua was the eldest child of Mom Rajawongse Sathan Snidvongs or Chaophraya Wongsanupraphat and his wife Bang Snidvongs na Ayudhya or Thao Wanida Phicharini. She has three full siblings, Mom Luang Sa-ngop Snidvongs, Mom Luang Chinda Snidvongs and Thanphuying Maniratana Bunnag.

She attended Saipanya School and Wattana Wittaya Academy. In 1928 Bua entered the service of Queen Rambhai Barni as a lady-in-waiting. In 1929 she played Nang Phrai Nam, on the film Waen Wiset. She served as a royal courtier and was active in charities until withdrawing from the social scene in the 1950s.

Marriage 
In 1928 she married Nakkhatra Mangala, Prince of Chanthaburi II, a Thai royal diplomat and produced the following children:
 Mom Rajawongse Kalyanakit Kitiyakara (20 September 1929 – 15 May 1987) married Arun Snidvongs na Ayudhya.
 Mom Rajawongse Adulakit Kitiyakara (2 November 1930 – 5 May 2004) married Princess Bandhusavali Yugala.
 Queen Sirikit (12 August 1932) married King Bhumibol Adulyadej.
 Thanphuying Busba Sathanaphong (2 August 1934) married Mom Luang Thawisan Ladawan, but they divorced. Busba married Surayudh Sathanaphong.

Death 
Bua died in Siriraj Hospital in Bangkok, Thailand on 19 September 1999, at the age of 89.

Issue

Ancestry

References

1909 births
1999 deaths
Bua Kitiyakara
Bua Kitiyakara
Bua Kitiyakara
Bua Kitiyakara
Bua Kitiyakara
Bua Kitiyakara
Bua Kitiyakara
20th-century Chakri dynasty
Ladies-in-waiting